Austromacoma constricta is a species of bivalve belonging to the family Tellinidae.

The species is found in both North and South America.

References

Tellinidae
Bivalves described in 1792
Bivalves of North America